Ras-related protein Rab-6C is a protein that in humans is encoded by the RAB6C gene.

References

Further reading